Cultural-historical activity theory (CHAT) is a theoretical framework which helps to understand and analyse the relationship between the human mind (what people think and feel) and activity (what people do). It traces its origins to the founders of the cultural-historical school of Russian psychology L. S. Vygotsky and Aleksei N. Leontiev. Vygotsky's important insight into the dynamics of consciousness was that it is essentially subjective and shaped by the history of  each individual's social and cultural experience. Especially since the 1990s, CHAT has attracted a growing interest among academics worldwide. Elsewhere CHAT has been defined as "a cross-disciplinary framework for studying how humans purposefully transform natural and social reality, including themselves, as an ongoing culturally and historically situated, materially and socially mediated process". Core ideas are: 1) humans act collectively, learn by doing, and communicate in and via their actions; 2) humans make, employ, and adapt tools of all kinds to learn and communicate; and 3) community is central to the process of making and interpreting meaning – and thus to all forms of learning, communicating, and acting.

Historical overview

Origins: revolutionary Russia
CHAT traces its lineage to dialectical materialism, classical German philosophy, and the work of Lev Vygotsky, Aleksei N. Leontiev and Aleksandr Luria, known as "the founding troika" of the cultural-historical approach to Social Psychology. In a radical departure from the behaviorism and reflexology that dominated much of psychology in the early 1920s, they formulated, in the spirit of Karl Marx's Theses on Feuerbach, the concept of activity, i.e., "artifact-mediated and object-oriented action". By bringing together the notion of history and culture in the understanding of human activity, they were able to transcend the Cartesian dualism between subject and object, internal and external, between people and society, between individual inner consciousness and the outer world of society. Lev Vygotsky, who created the foundation of cultural-historical psychology, based on the concept of mediation, published six books on psychology topics during a working life which spanned only ten years. He died of TB in 1934 at the age of 37. A.N. Leont'ev worked with Lev Vygotsky and Alexandr Luria from 1924 to 1930, collaborating on the development of a Marxist psychology. Leontiev left Vygotsky's group in Moscow in 1931, to take up a position in Kharkov. There he was joined by local psychologists, including Pyotr Galperin and Pyotr Zinchenko. He continued to work with Vygotsky for some time but, eventually, there was a split, although they continued to communicate with one another on scientific matters. Leontiev returned to Moscow in 1934. Contrary to popular belief, Vygotsky's work per se was never banned in Stalinist Soviet Russia. In 1950 A.N.Leontiev became the Head of the Psychology Department at the Faculty of Philosophy of the Lomonosov Moscow State University (MGU). This department became an independent Faculty in 1966 due mainly to his hard work. He remained there until his death in 1979. Leontiev's formulation of activity theory, post 1962, had become the new "official" basis for Soviet psychology. In the two decades between a thaw in the suppression of scientific enquiry in Russia and the death of the Vygotsky's continuers, contact was made with the West.

Developments in the West
Michael Cole, then a young Indiana University psychology post-graduate exchange student, arrived in Moscow in 1962 for a one-year stint of research under Alexandr Luria. Keenly aware of the gulf between Soviet and American psychology, he was one for the first Westerners to present Luria's and Vygotsky's idea to an Anglo-Saxon public. This, and a steady flow of books translated from the Russian ensured the gradual establishment of a solid Cultural Psychology base in the west. Another American scholar, James V. Wertsch, after completing his PhD at the University of Chicago in 1975, spent a year as a postdoctoral fellow in Moscow to study linguistics and neuropsychology. Wertsch subsequently became one of the leading Western experts on Soviet Psychology. Principal among the groups promoting CHAT-related research is Yjrö Engeström's Helsinki-based CRADLE. In 1982 an Activity Conference, claimed to have been the first of its kind in Europe, organized by Yrjö Engeström to concentrate on teaching and learning issues, took place in Espoo (Fl), with the participation of experts from both Eastern and Western European countries. This was followed by the Aarhus (Dk) Conference in 1983 and the Utrecht (Nl) conference in 1984. In October 1986, West Berlin's College of Arts hosted the first ISCAR International Congress on Activity Theory. This was also the first effort to bring together under one roof researchers, theorists, and philosophers working in the tradition of the Soviet psychologists Leontiev and Vygotsky. The second ISCRAT congress took place in Lahti, (Fl) in 1990. ISCRAT became a formal legal organization with its own by-laws in Amsterdam, 1992. Other ISCRAT conferences: Rome (1993), Moscow (1995), Aarhus (1998) and Amsterdam (2002), when ISCRAT and the Conference for Socio-Cultural Research merged into ISCAR. From here on, ISCAR organizes an international Congress every three years: Sevilla (Es) 2005; San Diego (USA) 2008; Rome (It) 2011; Sydney (Au) 2014; Quebec, Canada (2017).

In more recent years the implications of activity theory in organizational development have been promoted by the work Yrjö Engeström's team at the Centre for Activity Theory and Developmental Work Research (CATDWR) at the University of Helsinki, and Mike Cole at the Laboratory of Comparative Human Cognition (LCHC) at the University of California San Diego campus.

The three generations of activity theory
In his 1987 "Learning by expanding", Engeström offers a very detailed account of the diverse sources, philosophical and psychological, that inform activity theory. In subsequent years, however, a simplified picture has emerged from his and other researchers' work, namely the idea that (to date) there are three principal 'stages' or 'generations' of activity theory, or "cultural-historical activity theory (CHAT). Whilst the first generation built on Vygotsky's notion of mediated action, from the individual's perspective, and the second generation built on Leont'ev's notion of activity system, with emphasis on the collective, the third generation, which appeared in the mid-nineties, builds on the idea of multiple interacting activity systems focused on a partially shared object, and boundary-crossings between them.

First generation – Vygotsky
The first generation emerges from Vygotsky's theory of cultural mediation, which was a response to behaviorism's explanation of consciousness, or the development of the human mind, by reducing "mind" to a series of atomic components or structures associated primarily with the brain as "stimulus – response" (S-R) processes. Vygotsky argued that the relationship between a human subject and an object is never direct but must be sought in society and culture as they evolve historically, rather than in the human brain or individual mind unto itself. His cultural-historical psychology attempted to account for the social origins of language and thinking.  To Vygotsky, consciousness emerges from human activity mediated by artifacts (tools) and signs.  This idea of semiotic mediation is embodied in Vygotsky's famous triangular model which features the Subject (S), Object (O), and Mediating Artifact triad: in mediated action the Subject, Object, and Artifact stand in a dialectical relationship whereby each affects the other and the activity as a whole. Vygotsky argues that the use of signs leads to a specific structure of human behavior, which breaks away from mere biological development allowing the creation of new forms of culturally-based psychological processes – hence the importance of (cultural-historical) context: individuals could no longer be understood without their cultural environment, nor society without the agency of the individuals who use and produced these artifacts. The objects became cultural entities, and action oriented towards the objects became the key to understanding the human psyche. In the Vygotskyan framework the unit of analysis, however, remains principally the individual. First-generation activity theory has been used to understand individual behavior by examining the ways in which a person's objectivized actions are culturally mediated.  Besides a strong focus on material and symbolic mediation, internalization of external (social, societal, and cultural) forms of mediation, another important aspect of first generation CHAT is the concept of the zone of proximal development (ZPD), meaning, as advanced in Mind in Society (1978), "the distance between the actual developmental level as determined by independent problem solving and the level of potential development as determined through problem solving under adult guidance or in collaboration with more capable peers". ZPD is one of the major legacies of Vygotsky's work in the social sciences.

Second generation – Leontiev
While Vygotsky formulated practical human activity as the general explanatory category in human psychology, he did not fully clarify its precise nature. The second generation moves, beyond Vygotsky's individually-focused to A.N. Leontiev's collective model. In Engeström's now famous graphic depiction of second-generation activity, the unit of analysis has been expanded to include collective motivated activity toward an object, making room for understanding how collective action by social groups mediates activity. Hence the inclusion of community, rules, division of labor and the importance of analyzing their interactions with each other. Rules may be explicit or implicit. Division of labor refers to the explicit and implicit organization of the community involved in the activity.  Engeström articulated the clearest distinction between classic Vygotskian psychology, which emphasizes the way semiotic and cultural systems mediate human action, and Leontiev's second-generation  CHAT, which is focused on the mediational effects of the systemic organization of human activity.  In insisting that activity only exists in relation to rules, community and division of labor, Engeström expands the unit of analysis for studying human behavior from that of individual activity to a collective activity system. The collective activity system includes the social, psychological, cultural and institutional perspectives in the analysis. In this conceptualization context or activity systems are inherently related to what Engeström argues are the deep-seated material practices and socioeconomic structures of a given culture. These societal dimensions had not been taken sufficiently into account by Vygotsky's, earlier, more 'simple' triadic model: in Leontiev's understanding, thought and cognition should be understood as a part of social life – as a part of the means of production and systems of social relations on one hand, and the intentions of individuals in certain social conditions on the other.

In his famous example of the 'primeval collective hunt', Leontiev clarifies the crucial difference between an individual action ("the beater frightening game") and a collective activity ("the hunt"). While individuals' actions (frightening game) are different from the overall goal of the activity (hunt), they all share in the same motive (obtaining food). Operations, on the other hand, are driven by the conditions and tools at hand, i.e. the objective circumstances under which the hunt is taking place. To understand the separate actions of the individuals, one needs to understand the broader motive behind the activity as a whole: this accounts for the three hierarchical levels of human functioning: object-related motives drive the collective activity (top); goals drive individual/group action(s) (middle); conditions and tools drive automated operations (lower level).

Third generation – Engeström et al.
After Vygotsky's foundational work on the individual's higher psychological functions and Leontiev's extension of these insights to collective activity systems, questions of diversity and dialogue between different traditions or perspectives became increasingly serious challenges, when, especially in the post-1990s, activity theory 'went international'. The work of Michael Cole and Yrjö Engeström in the 1970s and 1980s – mostly in parallel, but occasionally in collaboration – brought activity theory to a much wider audience of scholars in Scandinavia and North America. Once the lives and biographies of all the participants and the history of the wider community are taken into account, multiple activity systems need to be considered, positing, according to Engeström, the need for a "third generation" to "develop conceptual tools to understand dialogue, multiple perspectives, and networks of interacting activity Systems". This larger canvas of active individuals (and researchers) embedded in organizational, political, and discursive practices constitutes a tangible advantage of second- and third-generation CHAT over its earlier Vygotskian ancestor, which focused on mediated action in relative isolation Third-generation activity theory is the application of Activity Systems Analysis (ASA) in developmental research where investigators take a participatory and interventionist role in the participants' activities and change their experiences.  Engeström's now famous diagram, or basic activity triangle, – (which adds rules/norms, intersubjective community relations, and division of labor, as well as multiple activity systems sharing an object) – has become the principal third-generation model among the research community for analysing individuals and groups. Engeström summarizes the current state of CHAT with five principles:
 The activity system as primary unit of analysis: the basic third-generation model includes minimally two interacting activity systems. 
 Multi-voicedness: an activity system is always a community of multiple points of views, traditions and interests.
 Historicity: activity systems take shape and get transformed over long stretches of time. Potentials and problems can only be understood against the background of their own histories. 
 The central role of contradictions as sources of change and development. 
 Activity Systems' possibility for expansive transformation (cycles of qualitative transformation):  when object and motive are reconceptualized a radically wider horizon opens up. 
Most often, learning technologists have used third-generation CHAT as a guiding theoretical framework to understand how technologies are adopted, adapted, and configured through use in complex social situations.

Informing research and practice

Leontiev and social development
From the 1960s onwards, starting in the global South, and independently from the mainstream European developmental line, Leontiev's core  Objective Activity concept has been used in a Social Development context. In the Organization Workshop's Large Group Capacitation-method, objective/ized activity acts as the core causal principle which postulates that, in order to change the mind-set of (large groups of) individuals, we need to start with changes to their activity – and/or to the object that "suggests" their activity. In Leontievian vein, the Organization Workshop is all about semiotically mediated activities through which (large groups of) participants  learn how to manage themselves and the organizations they create to perform tasks that require a complex division of labor.

CHAT-inspired research and practice since the 1980s
Especially over the last two decades, CHAT has offered a theoretical lens informing research and practice, in that it posits that learning takes place through collective activities that are purposefully conducted around a common object.  Starting from the premise that learning is a social and cultural process that draws on historical achievements, its systems thinking-based perspectives allow insights into the real world.

Change Laboratory (CL)
Change Laboratory (CL) is a CHAT-based method for formative intervention in activity systems and for research on their developmental potential as well as processes of expansive learning, collaborative concept-formation, and transformation of practices, elaborated in the mid-nineties by the Finnish Developmental Work Research (DWR) group.
The CL method relies on collaboration between the practitioners of the activity being analyzed and transformed, and academic researchers or interventionists supporting and facilitating collective developmental processes. On the basis of Engeström's theory of expansive learning, the foundation of an interventionist research approach at DWR was elaborated in the 1980s, and developed further in the 1990s as an intervention method now known as Change Laboratory. CL interventions are used both to study the conditions of change and to help those working in organizations to develop their work, drawing on participant observation, interviews, and the recording and videotaping of meetings and work practices.  Initially, with the help of an external interventionist, the first stimulus that is beyond the actors' present capabilities, is produced in the Change Laboratory by collecting first-hand empirical data on problematic aspects of the activity. This data may comprise difficult client cases, descriptions of recurrent disturbances and ruptures in the process of producing the outcome. Steps in the CL process: Step 1 Questioning; Step 2 Analysis;  Step 3 Modeling; Step 4 Examining; Step 5 Implementing; Step 6 Reflecting; Step 7 Consolidating.  These seven action steps for increased understanding are described by Engeström as expansive learning, or phases of an outwardly expanding spiral, while multiple kinds of actions can take place at any time. The phases of the model simply allow for the identification and analysis of the dominant action type during a particular period of time. These learning actions are provoked by contradictions. CL is used by a team or work unit or by collaborating partners across the organizational boundaries, initially with the help of an interventionist-researcher. The CL method has been used in agricultural contexts, educational and media settings, health care and learning support.

Activity systems analysis (ASA)
Activity systems analysis is a CHAT-based method, discussed in / and in Cole & Engeström, 1993, for understanding human activity in real-world situations with data collection, analysis, and presentation methods that address the complexities of human activity in natural settings aimed to advance both theory and practice. It is based on Vygotsky's concept of mediated action and captures human activity in a triangle model that includes the subject, tool, object, rule, community, and division of labor. Subjects are participants in an activity, motivated toward a purpose or attainment of the object. The object can be the goal of an activity, the subject's motives for participating in an activity, and the material products that subjects gain through an activity. Tools are socially shared cognitive and/or material resources that subjects can use to attain the object. Informal or formal rules regulate the subject's participation while engaging in an activity. The community is the group or organization to which subjects belong. The division of labor is the shared participation responsibilities in the activity determined by the community. Finally, the outcome is the consequences that the subject faces because of his/her actions driven by the object. These outcomes can encourage or hinder the subject's participation in future activities. In Part 2 of her video "Using Activity Theory to understand human behaviour",  shows how activity theory is applied to the problem of behavior change and HIV and AIDs (in South Africa). The video focuses on sexual activity as the activity of the system and illustrates how an Activity System Analysis, through a historical and current account of the activity, provides a way of understanding the lack of behavior change in response to HIV and AIDS. In her eponymous book "Activity Systems Analysis Methods.",  describes seven ASA case studies which fall "into four distinct work clusters. These clusters include works that help (a) understand developmental work research (DWR), (b) describe real-world learning situations, (c) design human-computer interaction systems, and (d) plan solutions to complicated work-based problems". Other uses of ASA: Summarizing organizational change; Identifying guidelines for designing Constructivist Learning Environments; Identifying contradictions and tensions that shape developments in educational settings; Demonstrating historical developments in organizational learning., and Evaluating K–12 school and university partnership relations.

Human–computer interaction (HCI)
When HCI first appeared on the scene as a separate field of study in the early 1980s, HCI adopted the information processing paradigm of computer science as the model for human cognition, predicated on prevalent cognitive psychology criteria, which, it was soon realized, failed to account for individuals' interests, needs and frustrations involved, nor of the fact that the technology critically depends on complex, meaningful, social, and dynamic contexts in which it takes place. Adopting a CHAT theoretical perspective had important implications for understanding how people use interactive technologies: the realization, for example, that a computer is typically an object of activity rather than a mediating artefact means that people interact with the world through computers, rather than with computer 'objects'. A number of diverse methodologies outlining techniques for human–computer interaction design have emerged since the rise of the field in the 1980s. Most design methodologies stem from a model for how users, designers, and technical systems interact. Bonnie Nardi produced the – hitherto – most applicable collection of activity theoretical HCI literature.

Systemic-structural activity theory (SSAT)
SSAT builds on the general theory of activity to provide an effective basis for both experimental and analytic methods of studying human performance, using carefully developed units of analysis SSAT approaches cognition both as a process and as a structured system of actions or other functional information-processing units, developing a taxonomy of human activity through the use of structurally organized units of analysis. The systemic-structural approach to activity design and analysis involves identifying the available means of work, tools and objects; their relationship with possible strategies of work activity; existing constraints on activity performance; social norms and rules; possible stages of object transformation; and changes in the structure of activity during skills acquisition.This method is demonstrated by applying it to the study of a human–computer interaction task.

Future

Evolving field of study
The strengths of CHAT are grounded both in its long historical roots and extensive contemporary use: it offers a philosophical and cross-disciplinary perspective for analyzing diverse human practices as development processes in which both individual and social levels are interlinked, as well as interactions and boundary-crossings. between activity systems More recently, the focus of studies of organizational learning has increasingly shifted away from learning within single organizations or organizational units, towards learning in multi‐organizational or inter‐organizational networks, as well as to the exploration and better understanding of interactions in their social context, multiple contexts and cultures, and the dynamics and development of particular activities. This shift has generated, among others, such concepts as "networks of learning" and "networked learning", coworking, and knotworking. Industry of late has seen strong growth in nonemployer firms (NEFs), thanks to changes in long-term employment trends and developments in mobile technology which have led to more work from remote locations, more distance collaboration, and more work organized around temporary projects. Developments such as these and new forms of social production or commons-based peer production, such as e.g. open source development and cultural production in peer-to-peer (P2P) networks, have become a key focus in Engeström's more recent work.

"Fourth generation"
The rapid rise of new forms of activities characterised by web-based social and participatory practices, 
, phenomena such as distributed workforce and the dominance of knowledge work, prompts a rethink of the third-generation model, bringing with it the need, as suggested by Engestrōm, for a new, fourth generation activity system model. which activity theorists indeed have been working on in recent years. In fourth generation CHAT, the object(ive) will typically comprise multiple perspectives and contexts and be inherently transient; collaborations between actors, too, are likely to be temporary, with multiple boundary crossings between interrelated activities. Fourth-generation activity theorists have specifically developed activity theory to better accommodate Castells's (and others') insights into how work organization has shifted in the network society: they hence will focus less on the workings of individual activity systems (often represented by triangles) and more on the interactions across activity systems functioning in networks. The 2017 ISCAR congress (August, Quebec City) has the following theme: ''Taking a 360° view of the landscape of cultural-historical activity research:The state of our scholarship in practice.

See also
 Activity theory
 Aleksei N. Leontiev
 Bonnie Nardi
 Community of practice
 Cultural-historical psychology
 Expansive learning
 Kharkov School of Psychology
 Knowledge sharing
 Large-group capacitation
 Legitimate peripheral participation
 Lev Vygotsky
 Organizational learning
 Organization workshop
 Social constructivism (learning theory)
 Vygotsky Circle
 Zone of proximal development

Publications
 
 
 ISSN 0304-615X
 
 
 
 
   
 
 
 
 
 
  
 .
 
 
 
 
 
 
  
 
 
 
 
 
 
 
 
 
 
  
 
 
 
  
   – Chapter 25 in: Yogesh K. Dwivedi, Y.K. Lal, B., Williams, M., Schneberger, S.L., Wade, M., 2009, Handbook of Research on Contemporary Theoretical Models in Information Systems, IGI Global, 2009, 
 
 
 
 
 
  
 
 
 
 
  in:

References

External links
 Blunden, A. The Origins of CHAT.
  Blunden, A. Concepts of CHAT Action, Behaviour and Consciousness (ppts).
 Blunden, A. Genealogy of Cultural Historical Activity Theory (chart)
 Boardman, D. Activity Theory
 CRADLE Helsinki
 Interview with Professor Yrjö Engeström: part 1
 Interview with Professor Yrjö Engeström: part 2
 Introduction to Cultural Historical Activity Theory (CHAT) Nygård
 Leontiev works in English
 Robertson, I. An Introduction to Activity Theory
  Spinuzzi, Clay "All Edge: Understanding the New Workplace Networks" (Powerpoint Presentation)
 The Future of Activity Theory
 van der Riet Part I Introduction to Cultural Historical Activity Theory (CHAT)
 van der Riet Part II Using Activity to Understand Human Behaviour
 Vygotsky archive
 Yamagata "Activity Systems Analysis in Design Research". (Powerpoint Presentation)
 What is Activity Theory?

Adult education
Cognitive psychology
Learning methods
Social change
Training